The 1965 All-Ireland Junior Hurling Championship was the 44th staging of the All-Ireland Junior Championship since its establishment by the Gaelic Athletic Association in 1912.

Down entered the championship as the defending champions, however, they were beaten by Armagh in the Ulster final.

The All-Ireland final was played on 3 October 1965 at St. Coman's Park in Roscommon, between Roscommon and Armagh, in what was their first ever meeting in the final. Roscommon won the match by 3-10 to 2-11 to claim their first championship title.

Results

All-Ireland Junior Hurling Championship

All-Ireland semi-finals

All-Ireland home final

All-Ireland final

References

Junior
All-Ireland Junior Hurling Championship